India is a country in Asia. It is a union made up of states and union territories. Some of these states and territories have adopted songs for the use at state functions and ceremonies. In other states, songs have been proposed or are in popular, traditional or unofficial use.

Official state songs

Unofficial, traditional and popular state songs

Proposed state songs

The governments of Goa, Haryana Kerala, Uttar Pradesh and West Bengal are currently in the process of selecting official state songs.

See also

 Jana Gana Mana, the national anthem of India
 Vande Mataram, the national song of India
 List of regional anthems
 List of Indian state symbols
 List of Indian state flags
 List of Indian state emblems
 List of Indian state mottos
 List of Indian state foundation days
 List of Indian state animals
 List of Indian state birds
 List of Indian state flowers
 List of Indian state trees

References

External links
Melodies of Freedom

Indian songs
 
Indian patriotic songs
India
Indian culture-related lists
Lists of Indian state symbols